Alex Yermolinsky (born April 11, 1958) is an American chess player. Awarded the title of Grandmaster by FIDE in 1992, he is a two-time U.S. champion.

Career 
Yermolinsky tied for first with Vladislav Vorotnikov in the Leningrad City Chess Championship in 1985. In 1993, Yermolinsky won the U.S. Chess Championship, tying for first place with Alexander Shabalov. In 1996 he was the sole champion. 
He won the World Open in Philadelphia three times: in 1993, 1995 and 1996; in 1999 he shared first with nine other players, but Gregory Serper won the playoff. In 2001 he won the American Continental Championship in Cali, Colombia.

In 2012 Yermolinsky was inducted into the US Chess Hall of Fame.

He is a regular commentator and presenter on the Internet Chess Club.

Books
 Yermolinsky, Alex (2000). Road to Chess Improvement. Gambit Publications. .
 Yermolinsky, Alex (2006). Chess Explained: The Classical Sicilian. Gambit Publications. .

References

External links
 
 
 
 
 GM Alexander Yermolinsky. United States Chess Federation.

1958 births
Living people
Chess grandmasters
American chess players
Chess Olympiad competitors
Sportspeople from Saint Petersburg
Soviet emigrants to the United States